The Nepal fulvetta (Alcippe nipalensis) or Nepal alcippe, as the fulvettas proper are not closely related to this species, is a bird species in the family Alcippeidae.

It is found in Bangladesh, Bhutan, China, India, Japan, Myanmar, Nepal, and Taiwan. Its natural habitats are subtropical or tropical moist lowland forest and subtropical or tropical moist montane forest.

References

Collar, N. J. & Robson C. 2007. Family Timaliidae (Babblers)  pp. 70 – 291 in; del Hoyo, J., Elliott, A. & Christie, D.A. eds. Handbook of the Birds of the World, Vol. 12. Picathartes to Tits and Chickadees. Lynx Edicions, Barcelona.

Nepal fulvetta
Birds of Nepal
Birds of Eastern Himalaya
Birds of Myanmar
Nepal fulvetta
Taxonomy articles created by Polbot